Richard James Mayhew (born 15 December 1970) is a sailor from Cape Town, South Africa. who represented his country at the 1992 Summer Olympics in Barcelona, Spain as crew member in the Soling. With helmsman Bruce Savage and fellow crew member Giles Stanley they took the 14th place. Rick with helmsman Bruce Savage and fellow crew member Clynton Lehman took 17th place during the 1996 Summer Olympics in Savannah, United States in the Soling.

References

Living people
1970 births
Sportspeople from Cape Town
Sailors at the 1992 Summer Olympics – Soling
Sailors at the 1996 Summer Olympics – Soling
Olympic sailors of South Africa
South African male sailors (sport)